Nikonas Spiliotakis (born 18 September 1995) is a Greek footballer born at Heraklion Crete. Up to the age of 18 he lived in Archanes. He graduated from the 8th high school of Heraklion and since he lives in Athens studying at the National and Kapodistrian University, at the faculty of sciences of physical activities and sports.

Club career

Candia Maris 
Candia Maris was the first club that he trained and played for, between the ages of 6 to 12.

Lido F.C. 
Candia Maris was merged with Lido F.C. and he played for this club until he became 16 years old. At 14 years old he was promoted to the first team, playing at the 1st regional division of Heraklion (at the time representing the 5th tier in Greek football) for 2 seasons. For his first season (2010-2011) he had played every match of the first round but in 5/1/2011 he injured his right knee (anterior cruciate ligament lesion with medial meniscus partial rupture) which cost him his absence for the rest of the championship with the exception of a few matches at the end. He finished with 20 games played, 2 goals and 5 assists. Next season he played in every game (approximately 30 matches) having 3 goals and 6 assists.

Giouchtas F.C. 
The season after (2012-2013) he was transferred to Giouchtas, he competed at the D' Division (4th tier) and succeeded to win a promotion to C' Division (3rd tier). He played in 17 out of 18 championship matches and in all 6 cup matches, having a total of 5 goals and 6 assists. His team reached the cup final where they were defeated with a 1-0 score against Irodotos.

Moschato F.C. 
Nikonas moved to Athens due to his studies at the local university. He came in contact with a big number of clubs including professional ones and decided to compete for Moschato playing at the 1st regional division of Piraeus (actually 4th tier of Greek football). The 2013-2014 season Nikonas played in 29 matches scoring 3 goals and having 7 assists. Moschato finished the championship being 2nd and reached the semi-final of Piraeus cup. He started the 2014 season with a knee injury (patellar tendinitis) that dissuaded him from playing time in some matches both in the start and the end of the championship. He finally had 24 appearances all competitions included with 5 goals and 11 assists. His team played the Piraeus cup final but lost 2-0 against Proodeftiki.

Heraklion XI and Crete XI 
He played for the Heraklion XI team from age 12 until he became 16 without missing a game, with an average of 4 goals and 5 assists per season. At the age of 17 he competed for Heraklion XI and then Crete XI finishing in the 3rd place in Greece. He played in every game and in the third place play-off Crete XI won against Thraki XI.

References 

Association football forwards
1995 births
Living people
Footballers from Heraklion
Greek footballers